history of terrorism in Europe. This has often been linked to nationalist and separatist movements (separating countries), while other acts have been related to politics (including anarchism, far-right and far-left extremism), religious extremism, or organized crime. Terrorism in the European sections of the intercontinental countries of Turkey and Russia are not included in this list.

History

Definitions
Defining terrorism is difficult, and there are more than one hundred definitions of it in scholarly literature. The term is used in polemical contexts, thus it can become a move in a campaign rather than an aid to thought. A simple definition would be "use of force against innocent people for political purposes". Some scholars argue that there is no true or correct definition due to terrorism being an abstract concept without a real presence. Legal definitions contain internal contradictions and might be misused. There is an overlap between terrorism and various other forms of conflict and violent action, including civil wars or non-international armed conflicts. This is the case with several significant non-international conflicts in Europe, where there thus can be dispute as to what counts as terrorism: examples include the Irish War of Independence (1919–21), the breakup of Yugoslavia and subsequent conflicts, the First (1994–6) and Second Chechen Wars (1999–2009), and the War of Dagestan (1999).

Early history
In the Middle Ages, maritime nations in Europe sponsored pirates and privateering against rivals, which can be compared to terrorism. The term "terror" is used about the reign of terror in France, carried out by the Jacobins in 1792-4.

Modern trends

Terrorism in Europe around the beginning of the twentieth century was often associated with anarchism.

Terrorism within the European Communities since 1951 has often been linked to separatist movements, including the Irish Republican Army within the United Kingdom, and Euskadi Ta Askatasuna within Spain. Other perpetrators have been linked to far-right and far-left extremism, environmental extremism and anarchism. Since 2001, there has been an increase in attacks linked to extremist Islamist groups, particularly in France. Many separatist terrorist activities also have a religious angle, as, for example, with Chechen separatism in Russia. The internationally co-ordinated element has seen increasing attempts by governments to seek to weaken extremist ideology, particularly Islamic extremism.

It remains the case that the majority of deaths from terrorism do not occur in the "West". When the Al Qaeda attacks against the United States in 2001 are excluded, only 0.5% of all deaths from terrorism have occurred in Western countries – European nations, United States, Canada and Australia – in the years 2000-14. There have been recent increases in the number of high-fatality attacks. There had been a decrease in the number of overall fatalities from terrorist attacks between 1990 and 2015, compared to those between 1970 and 1990. Prior to 1990, on average 150 people died each year from terrorist attacks; this figure would be even higher if the large number of people who died in 1988 from the Pan Am 2013 bombing were included. From 1990, an average of a little under 50 people died each year. There was an increase of fatalities from 2011, with the attacks by far-right extremist Anders Breivik in Norway, and Islamist extremist attacks in France in 2015 and 2016.

Europol has published an annual trend report on terrorist attacks (including failed, foiled, and completed attacks) and terrorist-related arrests in the EU since 2006. The reports identify that perpetrators' known or suspected affiliations have been disparate in nature. Europol break these down into five categories: jihadist terrorism (previously termed "religiously-inspired terrorism"); ethno-nationalist and separatist terrorism; left-wing and anarchist terrorism; right-wing terrorism; and single-issue terrorism. Europol's reports do not provide a breakdown of the proportion of attacks that have been completed or the type of damage inflicted. According to these data, the vast majority of terrorist attacks in the EU between 2006 and 2013 were affiliated with ethnonational or separatist motives, followed by left-wing and anarchist attacks, and those that are registered as 'unspecified'. A significant number of terror attacks were motivated religiously or associated with right-wing groups. Among those arrested on terror-related crimes, most were religiously motivated and form the largest group, followed by separatist related terror suspects.

In 2015, a total of 211 completed, failed, or foiled terrorist attacks were reported by EU states, resulting in 151 fatalities (of which 148 were in France, with 130 of them occurring during the November 2015 Paris attacks) and over 360 people injured. As in previous years, separatist attacks accounted for the largest proportion (65), followed by jihadist attacks (17). Jihadist attacks caused the largest number of fatalities (150) and injuries (250). The United Kingdom reported the largest number of attacks (103) but did not provide statistics on suspected affiliation. Tackling jihadist terrorism threats has become an over-riding priority for security services, although many commentators express concerns that the risk of far-right terrorism is currently being underestimated.

In 2017, British intelligence MI5 said that Northern Ireland is the most concentrated area of terrorist activity "probably anywhere in Europe", with weekly threats from dissident Irish republicans.

Europol report all deaths from terrorist activity in 2018 were caused by jihadist terrorism. As of 2019, Europol reported that left-wing terrorist groups in the EU had appeared to have ceased their operational activities.

Prevention

International cooperation

European states were at the fore of plans for an international criminal court under the League of Nations in the 1930s, working through the Committee for the Repression of Terrorism (CRT). The CRT sought to define terrorism and get nation's domestic policies to support anti-terrorism activities. Opposition by Britain and tensions over fascism in Germany and Italy limited the final proposals.

Current European cooperation in the field of counter-terrorism includes the European Police Office (Europol), an EU agency, and Interpol. TREVI was an early example of EU cooperation in this field.

The main transnational activity to combat terrorism in recent years has been through Europol. They have categorised acts of terrorism that have either failed, been foiled or been successfully executed within the European Union (EU) as either pertaining to religious issues, right-wing, left-wing or separatist movements. The field is subject to considerable cooperation among national authorities.

National authorities
In July 2014 France introduced legislation to combat terrorism by toughening surveillance, making it lawful to detain individuals linked to radical "Islamist" groups, and to block Internet sites that incite anti-Semitism, terrorism and hatred. The country's Interior Minister Bernard Cazeneuve revealed 600 French nationals were in Syria at the time or planned to go there. The bill includes a ban on foreign travel for up to six months for those believed to hold terrorist sympathies, provides for the confiscation and invalidation of passports, and prohibits airlines from allowing such individuals to fly.

From 2005, the United Kingdom government introduced the CONTEST strategy, which seeks to improve co-operation between security services, and other public and private organisations. This includes four strands, namely Pursue, (seeking to apprehend potential terrorists), Prevent, (seeking to reduce risks of 'radicalisation', deter potential terrorists and share information), Protect, (seeking to ensure the security of potential targets and organisations is optimised), and Prepare, (seeking to ensure an effective response in the immediate aftermath of any attack).  Similar strategies have been adopted by other countries across the European Union, and there have been increases in co-operation between nations and security forces.

Incidents

Deadliest attacks
The following is a list of terrorist incidents in Europe which resulted in at least ten civilian deaths. It lists attacks on civilians by non-state actors that are widely referred to as terrorism. It excludes attacks that took place in transcontinental countries such as Turkey and Russia. For incidents in Russia, see Terrorism in Russia and for incidents in Turkey, see Terrorism in Turkey.

 Key: motivation

Costliest attacks
These are the incidents that had the highest financial damage. By far the biggest three are listed here below, all having occurred in the United Kingdom, and all by the same organisation.

Terrorism by country and region

Terrorist activity in Belgium
Terrorism in Denmark
Terrorist incidents in France
Terrorism in Germany
Terrorism in Greece
Terrorism in Italy
List of terrorist incidents in the Netherlands
Terrorism in Norway
Terrorism in Russia
Terrorism in Serbia
Terrorism in Spain
Terrorism in Sweden
Terrorism in Switzerland
Terrorism in the United Kingdom
Terrorism in Yugoslavia

See also

Islamic terrorism in Europe
List of terrorist incidents
Terrorism in the United States

References

Bibliography 

 
Poland, J.M (1988). Understanding Terrorism. Englewood Cliffs. NJ: Prentice-Hall.

Further reading 

 Bakker, Edwin. "Characteristics of jihadi terrorists in Europe (2001–2009)." in Jihadi terrorism and the radicalisation challenge ( Routledge, 2016) pp. 145-158. online

 Burleigh, Michael. Blood and rage: a cultural history of terrorism. Harper, 2009.; major scholarly study
 Chaliand, Gérard and Arnaud Blin, eds. The history of terrorism: from antiquity to al Qaeda.  (University of California Press, 2007).
 Ebner, Julia. The rage: The vicious circle of Islamist and far-right extremism (Bloomsbury, 2017).
 Graef, Josefin. Imagining Far-right Terrorism: Violence, Immigration, and the Nation State in Contemporary Western Europe (Routledge, 20220.
 Hewitt, Christopher. "Terrorism and public opinion: A five country comparison." Terrorism and Political Violence 2.2 (1990): 145-170.
 Hof, Tobias. "From extremism to terrorism: The radicalisation of the far right in Italy and West Germany." Contemporary European History 27.3 (2018): 412-431.
 Hof, Tobias. "The threat of transnational terrorism." in Understanding Global Politics (Routledge, 2019) pp. 375-389.

 Jones, Seth G., Catrina Doxsee, and Nicholas Harrington. The Right-wing Terrorism Threat in Europe (Center for Strategic and International Studies (CSIS), 2020) online.
 Kaunert, Christian, Joana de Deus Pereira, and Mike Edwards. "Thick Europe, ontological security and parochial Europe: the re-emergence of far-right extremism and terrorism after the refugee crisis of 2015." European politics and society 23.1 (2022): 42-61. online
 Kaunert, Christian, and Sarah Léonard. "The collective securitisation of terrorism in the European Union." West European Politics 42.2 (2019): 261-277. online
 Kepel, Gilles. Terror in France (Princeton University Press, 2017).
 Koehler, Daniel. Right-wing terrorism in the 21st century: The ‘National Socialist Underground’ and the history of terror from the far-right in Germany (Routledge, 2016).

 Land, Isaac, ed., Enemies of humanity: the nineteenth-century war on terrorism. (Palgrave Macmillan, 2008).
 Miller, Martin A. The foundations of modern terrorism: state, society and the dynamics of political violence. (Cambridge UP, 2013). 
 Norris, Jesse J. "When (and where) can right-wing terrorists be charged with terrorism?" Critical studies on terrorism 13.4 (2020): 519-544.
 Pannier, Alice, and Olivier Schmitt. "To fight another day: France between the fight against terrorism and future warfare." International Affairs 95.4 (2019): 897-916. online
 Ravndal, Jacob Aasland. "Explaining right‐wing terrorism and violence in Western Europe: Grievances, opportunities and polarisation." European Journal of Political Research 57.4 (2018): 845-866. online

Romagnoli, M. 2016, "The Effects of Terrorism on Tourism: (Inter)relations, Motives & Risks", Almatourism, vol. 7, no. 5, pp. 125–133.
 Samaan, Jean-Loup, and Andreas Jacobs. "Countering jihadist terrorism: A comparative analysis of French and German experiences." Terrorism and Political Violence 32.2 (2020): 401-415. 

 Tausch, Arno. "Estimates on the Global Threat of Islamic State Terrorism in the Face of the 2015 Paris and Copenhagen Attacks," Middle East Review of International Affairs, (2015) 19#1 online

External links
European Counter Terrorism Centre – Europol
List of most wanted fugitives in Europe – Europol

 
Europe-related lists
Crime in Europe